Dave R. Gould (born September 1, 1969) is a Canadian musician and professional percussionist that lives in Hamilton, Ontario. Gould is a found sound artist who creates instruments from unique and household items. These instruments include the toilet, the washboard, and moose and caribou antlers, among others.  The bone section of his self-created instruments were recently featured in Hamilton's Anne Foster Windows.

Gould has recorded on several albums, including three solo albums; ADAD (2011),Truck for Sale (2011), and The Passion of Bobby Bedeque (2005).

In addition to drumming and singing in live shows, Dave also teaches music, performs for and edutains children, and runs and open mic & jam weekly at Corktown Pub, in Hamilton, Ontario.

Gould received the Hamilton Arts Award for Performance in 2013.

References 

1969 births
Living people
Canadian percussionists
Musicians from Hamilton, Ontario